Ruderly Manuel (born August 26, 1990) is a professional baseball pitcher. He was a member of the Netherlands national baseball team for the 2017 World Baseball Classic.

References

External links

1990 births
2017 World Baseball Classic players
Living people
Sparta-Feyenoord players
De Angelis North East Knights players
Baseball pitchers
Dutch baseball players
People from Willemstad